St. James Kingsessing, commonly called "Old Swedes," is an historic American church located at 68th Street and Woodland Avenue in the Kingsessing neighborhood of  Philadelphia, Pennsylvania.  It is one of the churches created by settlers and descendants of the Delaware Valley colony of New Sweden, a colony planted by the Swedish South Company that existed  from 1638 and 1655, when it was conquered by the Dutch. St. James, built in 1762, is a sister congregation to the old Swedish church of Gloria Dei in the Southwark neighborhood of Philadelphia.

References

Further reading
 The Old Swede's Church of St. James Kingsessing, 1762, printed 1911
Explore Parochial Report Trends

New Sweden
Churches in Philadelphia
Churches completed in 1762
1762 establishments in Pennsylvania
Episcopal Church in Pennsylvania